The Joseph Stout House, also known as the Hunt House and the Weart–Hunt House, is a historic stone house built in 1752 and located on Province Line Road in the Stoutsburg section of Hopewell Township in Mercer County, New Jersey, United States. It was documented by the Historic American Buildings Survey (HABS) in 1937. The house was added to the National Register of Historic Places on October 29, 1974, for its significance in military and religion history.

History and description
The fieldstone house was built in 1752 by Joseph Stout, one of the founders of the First Baptist Church of Hopewell. It is located on a hillside, the north elevation is two stories high and the south is three. During the American Revolutionary War, John Price Hunt lived here. On June 24, 1778, General George Washington held a council of war here in preparation for the Battle of Monmouth. In 1789, Wilson Stout sold the property to Jacob Weart. In 1853, Spencer Weart may have made extensive changes to the house. It remained in the Weart family until 1928.

See also
National Register of Historic Places listings in Mercer County, New Jersey
List of the oldest buildings in New Jersey
List of Washington's Headquarters during the Revolutionary War

References

External links

Hopewell Township, Mercer County, New Jersey
Stone houses in New Jersey
National Register of Historic Places in Mercer County, New Jersey
Houses in Mercer County, New Jersey
Houses completed in 1752
1752 establishments in New Jersey
Historic American Buildings Survey in New Jersey
New Jersey Register of Historic Places